Hypharpax is a genus of beetles in the family Carabidae, containing the following species:

 Hypharpax aereus (Dejean, 1829) 
 Hypharpax assimilis (Macleay, 1888) 
 Hypharpax australasiae (Dejean, 1829) 
 Hypharpax australis (Dejean, 1829) 
 Hypharpax bostockii (Castelnau, 1867) 
 Hypharpax convexiusculus (Macleay, 1871) 
 Hypharpax deyrollei (Castelnau, 1867) 
 Hypharpax flavitarsis Chaudoir, 1878
 Hypharpax flindersii (Castelnau, 1867) 
 Hypharpax habitans Sloane, 1895
 Hypharpax interioris Sloane, 1895
 Hypharpax kingii (Castelnau, 1867) 
 Hypharpax kreftii (Castelnau, 1867) 
 Hypharpax moestus (Dejean, 1829) 
 Hypharpax nitens Sloane, 1911
 Hypharpax obsoletus Blackburn, 1892
 Hypharpax peronii (Castelnau, 1867) 
 Hypharpax puncticollis (Macleay, 1888) 
 Hypharpax queenslandicus (Csiki, 1932) 
 Hypharpax ranula (Castelnau, 1867) 
 Hypharpax rotundipennis Chaudoir, 1878
 Hypharpax sculpturalis (Castelnau, 1867) 
 Hypharpax sloanei Blackburn, 1891
 Hypharpax subsericeus (Macleay, 1888) 
 Hypharpax vilis Blackburn, 1891

References

Harpalinae